Platyptilia calamicola is a moth of the family Pterophoridae. It is found in Java, Indonesia.

References

Moths described in 1937
calamicola
Endemic fauna of Indonesia